Rod Laver was the defending champion but lost in the semifinals to Jimmy Connors.

Connors won in the final 6–2, 6–2 against Ken Rosewall.

Seeds
All four seeds received a bye to the second round.

  Jimmy Connors (champion)
  Ken Rosewall (final)
  Ilie Năstase (semifinals)
  Rod Laver (semifinals)

Draw

Finals

Top half

Section 1

Section 2

Bottom half

Section 3

Section 4

External links
 Main draw

Singles